Katherine Kath (born Rose Marie Lily Faess; 11 August 1920 – 17 November 2012) was a French prima ballerina at the Theatre du Chatelet in Paris, who became an actress after suffering from an injury which destroyed her chances of continuing her career.

Kath was born  in Berck, Pas-de-Calais, France, where she also died, at age 92 in 2012, from undisclosed causes. Until shortly before then, she was living in London, near Fulham Road.

She appeared in many international films and television programmes during her acting career. She met British filmmaker Jack Clayton in 1952, during the making of Moulin Rouge, in which she portrayed the can-can dancer La Goulue and on which Clayton was the assistant director. 

Jack was gifted a watercolour of Katherine by Marcel Vertès, who won two academy awards for his work on the film. It was signed "A Jack Clayton tres amicalement".

The couple married in 1953, following Clayton's divorce from his first wife, Christine Norden, but the union was shortlived.

Filmography

Film

Television

References

External links

1920 births
2012 deaths
French film actresses
Prima ballerinas
People from Pas-de-Calais
French ballerinas
French television actresses
20th-century French actresses